Morozzo is a comune (municipality) in the Province of Cuneo in the Italian region Piedmont, located about  south of Turin and about  northeast of Cuneo.

Morozzo borders the following municipalities: Beinette, Castelletto Stura, Cuneo, Margarita, Mondovì, Montanera, Rocca de' Baldi, and Sant'Albano Stura.

References 

Cities and towns in Piedmont